The Canadian Defence Academy ("CDA") is an organization located within the Canadian Forces, created in 2000. The academy is situated within the Military Personnel Command and headquartered at Canadian Forces Base Kingston, in Ontario.

The CDA comprises several training institutes such as the Royal Military College of Canada, Canadian Forces College and the Royal Military College Saint-Jean; the Canadian Defence Academy Research Programme (CDARP) is a significant source of funding for research at these colleges for university teachers and groups in Engineering, Natural Sciences, Social Sciences and Humanities. The CDA is also responsible for the Canadian Military Journal, the Canadian Defence Academy Press and the Dallaire Centre of Excellence for Peace and Security. The CDA is commanded by Major-General Craig Aitchison, who replaced Rear Admiral Luc Cassivi on 14 August 2020.

References

Canadian Armed Forces
Military education and training in Canada
Canadian Armed Forces education and training establishments
Uniformed services of Canada